Campo da Imaculada Conceição is a football stadium in Funchal, Portugal. It is currently used for football matches and has a capacity for 1,824 people. The stadium is owned by C.S. Marítimo and forms part of the Complexo Desportivo do Marítimo training facility. The stadium is the home venue of Marítimo's reserve team, Marítimo B, as well as the youth teams.

History
The stadium opened in 1966, and was constructed using funds raised by Marítimo's fans who had purchased the land in 1958. The stadium received a facelift in the 1980s and again in 2001 when the land adjacent to the site was used to construct the Complexo Desportivo do Marítimo training facility.

First team matches
The following first team matches were held in the stadium, when the Estádio dos Barreiros was unavailable.

See also
Estádio dos Barreiros
Marítimo

Notes and references

Imaculada Conceição
C.S. Marítimo
Sport in Madeira
Funchal
Buildings and structures in Madeira
Sports venues completed in 1966